Dacus (Leptoxyda) is a subgenus of tephritid or fruit flies, genus Dacus, in the family Tephritidae.

Species list

 Dacus annulatus
 Dacus apostata
 Dacus apoxanthus
 Dacus basifasciatus
 Dacus chamun
 Dacus chapini
 Dacus erythraeus
 Dacus externellus
 Dacus freidbergi
 Dacus hamatus
 Dacus hapalus
 Dacus hyalobasis
 Dacus iaspideus
 Dacus inclytus
 Dacus inflatus
 Dacus inornatus
 Dacus interjectus
 Dacus longistylus
 Dacus macer
 Dacus marshalli
 Dacus maynei
 Dacus meladassus
 Dacus mochii
 Dacus obesus
 Dacus persicus
 Dacus phloginus
 Dacus purpurifrons
 Dacus pusillator
 Dacus retextus
 Dacus rubicundus
 Dacus rufoscutellatus
 Dacus rufus
 Dacus ruslan
 Dacus scaber
 Dacus seguyi
 Dacus semisphaereus
 Dacus sicatoluteus
 Dacus temnopterus
 Dacus triater
 Dacus umbrilatus
 Dacus woodi
 Dacus xanthopus
 Dacus zavattarii

References

Dacinae
Taxa named by Pierre-Justin-Marie Macquart
Insect subgenera